Canunda Wind Farm (formerly named Lake Bonney Central Wind Farm) is a $92.5 million, 46 MW wind power project located on grazing land approximately 16 kilometres south of Millicent, and 6 kilometres west of Tantanoola in South Australia. It is jointly owned by GDF Suez Energy AustraliaEn 72%) and Mitsui (28%).

The wind farm is made up of 23 Vestas 2.0 MW wind turbines, together with an underground electrical cable network, access tracks, crane hardstandings, wind monitoring masts and a 33 kV double-circuit distribution line. Each turbine consists of a  tower and  blades, and so are 107 metres in height to the tip of the blade. These wind turbines rotate at speeds between 9 rpm and 19 rpm, depending on the wind speed. The wind yield in South Australia enables Canunda to produce electricity at a 34 per cent capacity factor, a high yield by global standards.

The wind farm generates enough electricity to supply around 30,000 average South Australian homes. The Canunda Wind Farm distribution line is 16 km long and transports the generated electricity from the wind farm to a nearby substation at Snuggery. The distribution line traverses mostly roadside verges, avoiding areas of environmental sensitivity along the route. The Canunda Wind Farm provides a number of benefits to the local and wider community, including clean electricity generation, enhanced agricultural viability of the farms involved and increased diversity of electricity supply for South Australia and the south east in particular. There has also been widespread community interest in the project and site tours have commenced.

The Canunda Wind Farm was opened by the Premier of South Australia, Mike Rann, on 31 March 2005. The project was completed on time and on budget and Wind Prospect provided engineering support to the owners of the wind farm, International Power, during the construction phase. Canunda Wind Farm was International Power's first wind farm globally. It represents a diversification of the company's energy business in Australia.

See also

 Lake Bonney Wind Farm - Adjoining Wind Farm
 Wind power in South Australia

References

External links
 Wind power and wind farms in South Australia
Canundra Wind Farm puts AGL on the green map
 Photos of Canunda/Lake Bonney wind farms
 

Wind farms in South Australia
Limestone Coast